In Govender v Ragavayah, an important case in the South African law of succession, the applicant was a woman married in terms of Hindu rites, whose husband had died intestate. Accordingly, the parents of her husband stood to inherit his estate. The court noted that Hindu marriages were not recognised in South African law, which violated section 9 of the Constitution. Accordingly, the court ordered that the definition of “spouse” in section 1 of the Intestate Succession Act include the surviving spouse of a monogamous Hindu marriage. It is important to note that the ambit of this judgment was restricted to de facto monogamous Hindu marriages.

See also 
 South African law of succession

References 

 Govender v Ragavayah NO and Others 2009 (3) SA 178 (D).

South African persons case law
2009 in South African law
2009 in case law
Law of succession in South Africa